The Director is a novel by United States author Henry Denker, published in 1971.

The novel is about an ambitious young film director, named Jock Finley, who uses two prominent film stars Carr and Daisy Donnel (ostensibly based on John Wayne and Marilyn Monroe) to rebuild his already damaged career. The novel is laced with sharp dialogue and explicit sexual encounters in line with the counterculture of the 1970s. The Underlying theme of the novel is the clash of generations as of values.

1971 American novels
Novels about actors